Andrew Leslie Goodwin is a chemist. He is a university research professor and professor of materials chemistry at University of Oxford.

Education 
Goodwin was educated at Sydney Boys High School and represented Australia at the International Chemistry Olympiad in 1996, winning a gold medal.

Goodwin earned a BSc in chemistry and pure mathematics at University of Sydney (USYD) in 2002. He completed a Ph.D. in inorganic chemistry at USYD in 2004 under advisor Cameron Kepert. Goodwin earned a Ph.D. in mineral physics from University of Cambridge in 2006 under advisor Martin T. Dove. He was a junior research fellow at Trinity College, Cambridge from 2004 to 2009. Goodwin was a visiting fellow at the Australian National University in 2007.

Career 
From 2008 to 2014, Goodwin was an EPSRC Career Acceleration Fellow and an associate professor in the department of chemistry at University of Oxford. He became a professor of materials chemistry at University of Oxford in 2014 and a university research professor in 2018. He researches inorganic and solid-state chemistry. Goodwin's research has advanced the theoretical and applied studies of disorder and flexibility in materials. His laboratory applied diffraction and modelling techniques to study disordered materials and create new materials.

Personal life 
Goodwin is married to Jonathan. He is an LGBT academic.

Awards and honours 
Goodwin won the 2010 Harrison-Meldola Memorial Prize for his work in materials with "negative thermal expansion and in the field of total scattering methods." In 2013, Goodwin won the Marlow Award for his "innovative studies of the physical chemistry and chemical physics of amorphous materials." He won the 2017 Corday-Morgan Prize for his "innovative studies of correlated disorder and its role in functional materials." Goodwin is a 2018 United Kingdom winner of the Blavatnik Award for Young Scientists.

Goodwin received two five-year grants from the European Research Council: an ERC Starting Grant through the 2011 call of the Seventh Framework Program and an ERC Advanced Grant through the 2017 call of the Eighth Framework Program (Horizon 2020).

References

External links
 
 

Living people
University of Sydney alumni
Alumni of the University of Cambridge
Academics of the University of Oxford
Year of birth missing (living people)
British materials scientists
Australian materials scientists
21st-century Australian scientists
21st-century British chemists
Australian LGBT scientists
British LGBT scientists
Gay academics
Gay scientists
Australian emigrants to England
People educated at Sydney Boys High School
21st-century LGBT people
Solid state chemists